This is a list of lighthouses in Haiti.

Lighthouses

See also
 Lists of lighthouses and lightvessels

References

External links
 

Haiti
Lighthouses
Lighthouses